ARY Film Award for Best Actor in a Comic Role is one of the ARY Film Awards of Merit presented annually by the ARY Digital Network and Entertainment Channel to recognize the Male and female comic actor who has delivered an outstanding comedy performance while working in the film industry.

History

The Best Actor in a Comic Role category originates with the 1st ARY Film Awards ceremony since 2014. The Best Actor in a Comic Role is awarded by viewers voting and known as Best Actor in a Comic Role Viewers Choice but officially it is termed as Best Actor in a Comic Role. Since ARY Film Awards has been just started, this category has not a brief history.

Category

In ARY Film Awards, both performances by an actor in a Negative and Comic role, has been placed in different categories but both Male and Female actors are placed in single category, either for comic performance or for villain performance.

Winners and nominees 
As of the first ceremony, total of two were nominated. This category is among fourteen Viewers Awards in ARY Film Awards. 
Date and the award ceremony shows that the 2010 is the period from 2010-2020 (10 years-decade), while the year above winners and nominees shows that the film year in which they were releases, and the figure in bracket shows the ceremony number, for example; an award ceremony is held for the films of its previous year.

2010s

References

External links 

 

ARY Film Award winners
ARY Film Awards